This article lists the records set by Crystal Palace F.C., their managers and players, including honours won by the club and details of their performance in European competition. The player records section itemises the club's leading goalscorers and those who have made the most appearances in first-team competitions. It also records notable achievements by Palace players on the international stage, and the highest transfer fees paid and received by the club.

Honours and achievements

League 
English first tier (currently the Premier League)
 Highest finish: 3rd place, 1990–91
English second tier (currently the EFL Championship)
 Champions (2): 1978–79, 1993–94
 Runners-up (1): 1968–69
Play-off winners (4) (record): 1988–89, 1996–97, 2003–04, 2012–13
 Play-off runners-up (1): 1995–96
English third tier (currently EFL League One)
 Champions (1): 1920–21
 Runners-up (4): 1928–29 (South), 1930–31 (South), 1938–39 (South), 1963–64
English fourth tier (currently EFL League Two)
 Runners-up (1): 1960–61

Cups 
FA Cup
 Runners-up (2): 1989–90, 2015–16
Full Members Cup
 Winners (1): 1990–91

Wartime 
Football League South
Champions (1): 1940–41
Football League South 'D' Division
Champions (1): 1939–40

Regional 
Southern Football League Division One
Runners-up (1): 1913–14
Southern Football League Division Two
Champions (1): 1905–06
United League
Champions (1): 1906–07
 Runners-up (1): 1905–06
Southern Professional Floodlit Cup
 Runners-up (1): 1958–59
London Challenge Cup
Winners (3): 1912–13, 1913–14, 1920–21
 Runners-up (6): 1919–20, 1921–22, 1922–23, 1931–32, 1937–38, 1946–47
Surrey Senior Cup
Winners (3): 1996–97, 2000–01, 2001–02
Kent Senior Shield
 Winners (1): 1911–12
 Runners-up (1): 1912–13

Player records

Appearances 
 Youngest first-team player: John Bostock, 15 years, 287 days, v Watford, 29 October 2007
 Oldest first-team player: Jack Little, 41 years, 68 days v Gillingham (away), 3 April 1926
 First substitute: Keith Smith, v Leyton Orient, 28 August 1965

Most appearances
Competitive and professional matches only

Goalscorers 
 Most goals in a season: 54, Peter Simpson, 1930–31
 Most league goals in a season: 46, Peter Simpson, 1930–31
 Most league goals in a top-flight season: 21, Andy Johnson, 2004–05
 Most goals in a competitive match: 6, Peter Simpson, v Exeter City, Football League Division Three South, 4 October 1930
 Most goals in an FA Cup match: 4, Peter Simpson, v Newark Town, 13 December 1930
 Most goals in a League Cup match: 3
 Mark Bright, v Southend United, 25 September 1990
 Ian Wright, v Southend United, 25 September 1990
 Dwight Gayle, v Walsall, 26 August 2014
 Dwight Gayle, v Charlton Athletic, 23 September 2015
 Fastest recorded goal: 6 seconds, Keith Smith v Derby County (away), 12 December 1964
 Most hat-tricks, all competitions: 20, Peter Simpson
 Oldest player to score a goal: Kevin Phillips, 39 years 306 days, v Watford, 27 May 2013
 Quickest hat-trick in a League match: Kevin Phillips, 8 minutes, 37 seconds v Hull City, 5 March 2013
 Quickest hat-trick in a Cup match: Danny Butterfield, 6 minutes, 48 seconds v Wolverhampton Wanderers, FA Cup Fourth round Replay, 2 February 2010

Top goalscorers
Peter Simpson is the all-time top goalscorer for Crystal Palace. He was their leading goalscorer for five consecutive seasons, from 1929–30 to 1933–34.
Competitive, professional matches only. Goalscorers with an equal number of goals are ranked with the highest to lowest goals per game ratio.

International caps 
This section refers only to international caps won by players during their time at Crystal Palace.
 First capped player: Billy Davies for Wales, v Scotland, 7 March 1908, Dundee
 First capped player for England: Horace Colclough, v Wales, 16 March 1914, Cardiff
 Most capped player: 45, Wayne Hennessey, Wales
 Most capped player for England:
 9, Kenny Sansom
 9, Geoff Thomas
 First player to play in the World Cup Finals: Gregg Berhalter, 2002, United States
 First player to score in the World Cup Finals: Mile Jedinak, 2014, Australia

Transfers

Record transfer fees paid

Record transfer fees received

Managerial records 

 First manager: John Robson, managed the club from 1905 to 1907, encompassing 77 games.
 Longest serving manager: Edmund Goodman, managed the club from 1907 to 1925, encompassing 613 matches excluding wartime competition.
 Most successful manager: Steve Coppell, who took the club to an FA Cup final, third place in the top flight and won the Full Members Cup. He managed the club from 1984 to 1993, 1995–96, 1997–98, and 1999–2000, encompassing 565 matches in total.

Club records

Positions
Highest League Finish: 3rd in the Old First Division (now Premier League) 1990–91 season
Lowest League Finish:
Southern League: 1st in the Southern League Division Two, 1905-06 season
Football League: 24th in the Old Division Three South, 1950–51
 Highest League Position: 1st in the Old First Division, 29 September 1979 – 6 October 1979
 Lowest League Position: 20th in the Old Fourth Division, 2 September 1959

Goals 
 Most league goals scored in a season: 110, Division Four, 1960–61
 Fewest league goals scored in a season: 31, Premier League, 2019–20
 Most league goals conceded in a season: 86, Division Three South, 1953–54
 Fewest league goals conceded in a season:
 Southern League; 14, Division Two, 1905–06
 Football League; 24, Division Two, 1978–79

Points 
 Most points in a season:
 Two points for a win: 64, Division Four, 1960–61
 Three points for a win: 90, Division One, 1993–94

 Fewest points in a season:
 Two points for a win: 19, Division One, 1980–81
 Three points for a win: 33, Premier League, 1997–98

Matches

Firsts
 First match: New Brompton 0–3 Crystal Palace, United League, 1 September 1905
 First FA Cup match: Crystal Palace 7–0 Clapham, 7 October 1905, Crystal Palace Stadium
 First Southern League match: Crystal Palace 3–4 Southampton Reserves, 2 September 1905, Crystal Palace Stadium
 First Football League match: Merthyr 2–1 Crystal Palace, 28 August 1920
 First match at Herne Hill Velodrome: Crystal Palace 1–2 Southampton, 3 March 1915
 First match at The Nest:
 Friendly; Crystal Palace 4–1 Millwall, August 1918
 London Combination; Crystal Palace 4–2 Queens Park Rangers, 14 September 1918
 Southern League; Crystal Palace 2–2 Northampton Town 30 August 1919
 First match at Selhurst Park: Crystal Palace 0–1 Wednesday, 30 August 1924
 First European match: Crystal Palace 0–2 Samsunspor, 19 July 1998, Selhurst Park
 First League Cup match: Darlington 2–0 Crystal Palace, 12 October 1960

Record wins
 Record league win: 9–0 v Barrow, 10 October 1959
 Record FA Cup win: 7–0
 v Clapham, 7 October 1905
 v Luton Town, 16 January 1929
 Record League Cup win: 8–0 v Southend United, 25 September 1990
 Record European win: N/A
 Record Friendly win: 13–1 v GAK Graz, 16 July 2014

Record defeats
 Record league defeat home: 0–7 v Liverpool, 19 December 2020
 Record league defeat away: 0–9 v Liverpool, 12 September 1989
 Record FA Cup defeat: 0–9 v Burnley (away), 10 February 1909
 Record League Cup defeat: 0–5
 v Nottingham Forest (away), 1 November 1989
 v Liverpool (away), 24 January 2001
 Record European defeat: 0–2
 v Samsunspor (home), 19 July 1998
 v Samsunspor (away), 25 July 1998

Record consecutive results
This section applies to league matches only.
 Record consecutive wins: 8, 9 February – 26 March 1921
 Record consecutive Premier League wins: 5, 29 March – 19 April 2014
 Record consecutive draws: 5
 28 March – 16 April 1921
 30 December 1978 – 24 February 1979
 21 September – 19 October 2002
 Record consecutive defeats: 8
 18 April – 19 September 1925
 1 January – 14 March 1998
 21 May – 30 September 2017
 Record consecutive matches without a defeat: 18, 22 February – 13 August 1969
 Record consecutive top-division matches without a defeat: 10, 25 August – 27 October 1990
 Record consecutive matches without a draw: 24, 31 December 1960 – 26 August 1961
 Record consecutive matches without a win: 20, 3 March – 8 September 1962
 Record consecutive clean sheets: 6, 1 September 1920 – 25 September 1920
 Record consecutive matches without a clean sheet: 24, 30 September 1998 – 20 February 1999
 Record consecutive matches scoring: 24, 27 April 1929 – 21 December 1929
 Record consecutive matches without scoring: 9, 19 November 1994 – 2 January 1995

Home

 Record consecutive home wins: 12, 19 December 1925 – 28 August 1926
 Record consecutive home draws: 7
 24 March 1962 – 1 September 1962
 28 November 1998 – 13 February 1999
 Record consecutive home defeats: 6
 10 April 1925 – 12 September 1925
 10 January 1998 – 11 April 1998
 3 January 2016 – 19 March 2016
 Record consecutive home matches without a defeat: 32, 28 February 1931 – 17 September 1932
 Record consecutive home matches without a draw: 17, 17 February 1981 – 19 January 1982
 Record consecutive home matches without a win: 16, 4 May 1997 – 11 April 1998
 Record consecutive home clean sheets: 8
 28 December 1963 – 18 March 1964
 13 November 2010 – 19 February 2011
 Record consecutive home matches without a clean sheet: 19, 20 January 1951 – 17 November 1951
 Record consecutive home matches scoring: 36, 17 November 1928 – 6 September 1930
 Record consecutive home matches without scoring: 4
 3 March 1951 – 31 March 1951
 26 November 1994 – 31 December 1994
 7 February 2002 – 9 March 2002
 20 November 2004 – 26 December 2004

Away

 Record consecutive away wins: 5, 20 December 2003 – 7 February 2004
 Record consecutive away draws: 6, 18 November 1978 – 10 March 1979
 Record consecutive away defeats: 10
 1 April 1980 – 25 October 1980
 8 November 1980 – 7 March 1981
 Record consecutive away matches without a defeat: 10
 22 December 1928 – 1 April 1929
 26 December 1968 – 28 April 1969
 23 August 1975 – 6 December 1975
 18 November 1978 – 3 April 1979
 Record consecutive Premier League away matches without a defeat: 5, 28 December 2014 – 28 February 2015
 Record consecutive away matches without a draw: 18
 3 October 1960 – 19 August 1961
 12 April 1986 – 17 March 1987
 Record consecutive away matches without a win: 31, 15 March 1980 – 3 October 1981
 Record consecutive away clean sheets: 4
 27 December 1949 – 4 February 1950
 9 December 1978 – 10 March 1979
 8 December 2007 – 12 January 2008
 Record consecutive away matches without a clean sheet: 30, 22 March 1980 – 3 October 1981
 Record consecutive away matches scoring: 22, 17 March 1928 – 1 April 1929
 Record consecutive away matches without scoring: 8, 11 November 1950 – 24 February 1951

Attendances 

This section applies to attendances at Selhurst Park, where Crystal Palace have played their home matches since the start of the 1924–25 season. Attendance figures from the club's early days are approximate. Palace's highest attendance for a match outside of Selhurst Park is 88,619, v Manchester United at the 2016 FA Cup Final on 21 May 2016.

 Highest attendance: 51,482 11 May 1979 v Burnley
 Highest FA Cup attendance: 45,384 10 Mar 1965 v Leeds Utd
 Lowest attendance: 2,165 18 December 1935 v Newport County
 Highest seasonal average league attendance: 29,900, Division 1 1969-70
 Lowest seasonal average league attendance: 6,440, Division 2 1984-85

Crystal Palace in Europe

Record by season
Crystal Palace's scores are given first in all scorelines.

European attendance records 
 Highest recorded home attendance: 25,152 v Internazionale, 29 May 1971
 Lowest recorded home attendance:  11,758 v Samsunspor, 19 July 1998
 Highest recorded away attendance: 30,000 v Cagliari, 1 June 1971
 Lowest recorded away attendance: 28,000 v Internazionale, 4 June 1971

Notes

References
General

Specific

External links
Crystal Palace F.C. official site

Records
Crystal Palace